Artūras Katulis (born August 5, 1981) is a Lithuanian professional ice hockey player.

Career statistics

References

External links

1981 births
Dizel Penza players
HC Berkut-Kyiv players
HK Liepājas Metalurgs players
HK Neman Grodno players
Lithuanian ice hockey defencemen
Living people
Neftyanik Almetyevsk players
People from Elektrėnai
SaiPa players
SønderjyskE Ishockey players